Morazone (Novartrina, Orsimon, Rosimon-Neu, Tarcuzate) is a nonsteroidal anti-inflammatory drug (NSAID), originally developed by the German pharmaceutical company Ravensberg in the 1950s, which is used as an analgesic.
It produces phenmetrazine as a major metabolite and has been reported to have been abused as a recreational drug in the past.

See also 
 Famprofazone
 Morforex

References 

Substituted amphetamines
Phenylmorpholines
Nonsteroidal anti-inflammatory drugs
Pyrazolones
Stimulants
Norepinephrine-dopamine releasing agents